The 2009 Belgian Figure Skating Championships took place between 21 and 23 November 2008 in Lommel. Skaters competed in the discipline of ladies' singles.

Skaters from United Kingdom and The Netherlands competed as guest skaters and their results were discounted from the final results.

Senior results

Men

Ladies

External links
 results
 

Belgian Figure Skating Championships
2008 in figure skating
Belgian Figure Skating Championships, 2009